Sheykh Yusof (also Romanized as Sheykh Yūsof) is a village in Kani Bazar Rural District, Khalifan District, Mahabad County, West Azerbaijan Province, Iran. At the 2006 census, its population was 95, in 14 families.

References 

Populated places in Mahabad County